The 1977 West Texas State Buffaloes football team was an American football team that represented West Texas State University (now known as West Texas A&M University) as a member of the Missouri Valley Conference during the 1977 NCAA Division I football season. In their first year under head coach Bill Yung, the team compiled a 6–4–1 record (5–1 in the MVC).

Schedule

References

West Texas State
West Texas A&M Buffaloes football seasons
Missouri Valley Conference football champion seasons
West Texas State Buffaloes football